This is a list of icebergs by total area.

Recorded before the era of satellite photography, the 1956 iceberg's estimated dimensions are less reliable.

References

Physical oceanography
Icebergs